Fleurbaix is a commune in the Pas-de-Calais department in the Hauts-de-France region of France.

Geography
A Stream, the  "Becque du Biez", flows through the commune.

Population
The inhabitants are called Fleurbaisiens.

Places of interest
 The church of Notre-Dame, built in 1929, is the work of architect Louis M. Cordonnier.
 The four Commonwealth War Graves Commission cemeteries, including Rue-du-Bois Military Cemetery
 Remains of a Carthusian abbey.

See also
Communes of the Pas-de-Calais department
The Battle of Fromelles

References

External links

 Rue-David CWGC cemetery
 Rue-de-Bois CWGC cemetery
 Rue-Petillon CWGC cemetery
 The CWGC graveyard in the communal cemetery
 Website of the Sports Association .

Communes of Pas-de-Calais